Mladen Furtula (Serbian Cyrillic: Mлaдeн Фуpтулa; born September 17, 1950) is a former Bosnian Serb football goalkeeper.

Club career
After playing with FK Sutjeska Foča, he played for Belgrade's FK Partizan from 1969 to 1973. In 1974, he came to Greece for Panserraikos and he played for PAOK from 1975 until 1984. In 1976, he helped PAOK win their first Alpha Ethniki championship.

References

External links 
 
 

1950 births
Living people
Footballers from Sarajevo
Serbs of Bosnia and Herzegovina
Association football goalkeepers
Yugoslav footballers
FK Partizan players
FK Dinamo Pančevo players
Panserraikos F.C. players
PAOK FC players
Yugoslav First League players
Super League Greece players
Yugoslav expatriate footballers
Expatriate footballers in Greece
Yugoslav expatriate sportspeople in Greece